Hey Arnold!: The Jungle Movie is a 2017 American animated adventure comedy television film based on the Nickelodeon series Hey Arnold!, which was created by Craig Bartlett and originally aired from 1996 to 2004. Following the 2002 film Hey Arnold!: The Movie, The Jungle Movie expands on the fifth season two-part episode "The Journal".

The film serves as either the definitive series finale or a prelude to a potential revival. It answered questions left after the original run ended, including the whereabouts of Arnold's missing parents. It originally aired in the United States on November 24, 2017, on Nickelodeon, while also being simulcast on Nicktoons and TeenNick. In 2018, it won an Emmy for Outstanding Individual Achievement in Animation.

Plot
During the summer after their fifth grade year, Arnold and his best friend Gerald plan to make a humanitarian video to win a trip to San Lorenzo, a Central American country, where Arnold's parents were last seen. They try to record themselves making a house out of junk for one of their friends, the eccentric Monkeyman, but as they are filming, the local homeless, claiming the junk as their property, storm in and destroy the home, leaving Arnold heartbroken and demoralised.

Helga, who secretly has a longtime crush on Arnold, uses various video footage she has compiled over the years showing Arnold's good deeds, and everyone in town surprises Arnold with the video. Arnold's teacher Mr. Simmons reveals to everyone that Arnold's video won the competition and he, his classmates of P.S. 118, and Helga's older sister, Olga, fly to San Lorenzo.

While on the plane, Arnold's pet pig Abner stows away in his backpack. When everyone arrives in San Lorenzo, they are greeted by Arnold's parents' old friend, Eduardo. Aboard a ship, Eduardo privately warns Arnold of the jungle's dangers and gives him an amulet said to lead them to the "Green-Eyed People", the residents of San Lorenzo's lost city. Later that night, Helga tries to confess her feelings to Arnold, but the boat is attacked by pirates. After learning the secret that Arnold kept from them, Gerald, Helga and the others shun him.

When the group reaches a base camp, "Eduardo" reveals himself to be a mercenary named Lasombra, who disguised himself as Eduardo to deceive Arnold and the others. He and his men imprison everyone, explaining that the contest was a trick to lure Arnold to San Lorenzo, so he could use him to find the lost city and its treasures and reveals the whole class the deal he and Arnold made, causing them to shun him even more. After hearing Arnold cry for his parents and realizing he had nothing to do with Lasombra's plot, Helga and Gerald manage to escape and free Arnold, and use Arnold's father's old journal to find the city; unbeknownst to them, Lasombra anticipated this and placed a tracking device on Arnold's green-eyed necklace. Arnold and his friends manage to evade the lost city's traps, while Lasombra pursues them, sacrificing most of his men to the traps.

Meanwhile, Abner escapes and makes it back to Arnold's grandparents, Grandpa Phil and Grandma Gertie, who see this as a sign that Arnold is in trouble. The two meet with Helga's parents Big Bob and Miriam at the airport, who had received an SOS message from Helga's intelligent best friend, Phoebe. The group flies a rental plane to San Lorenzo, where they help the other kids defeat Lasombra's gang.

Arnold and the others reach the city, finding it populated by children due to a "sleeping sickness" that has left its adult population comatose for nine years. The group finds a statue said to contain the Corazón, a treasure that may lead to a cure for the sickness. Lasombra corners them, taking Arnold hostage and stealing the statue. While Gerald and Helga give chase, Lasombra forces Arnold to open the statue using the amulet. When Lasombra tries to take the Corazón within, the statue's defense system shoots him in the forehead with a poisoned dart, sending Lasombra over a cliff.

A mysterious man arrives and reveals himself to be the real Eduardo, who explains that the pirate "attacking" them earlier was him trying to rescue the group from Lasombra. Lasombra climbs back up from the cliff and gets into a brief scuffle with Eduardo, knocking the Corazón off the cliff, before succumbing to the poison and plummeting to his death. The group returns to the city, and Arnold finally sees his parents, Miles and Stella, who have also contracted the sleeping sickness. Without the Corazón to release the cure to the infected population, Helga uses her precious locket containing a photo of Arnold as a replacement. The temple releases the cure and the infected are revived. Arnold and the city's children reunite with their parents, and Arnold thanks Helga for her loyalty and finally realizes the depths of her feelings for him, and the two share a kiss long awaited by the audience.

A few months later, life as normal has resumed at Arnold's grandparents' boarding house, though now with Miles and Stella living there as well. Arnold says goodbye to his parents as he heads off for his first day of sixth grade with Gerald, Phoebe, and Helga. Gerald and Phoebe are seen holding hands walking to school together, while Arnold and Helga are also implied to be a couple, despite Helga pretending to remain hostile towards Arnold once in public to avoid embarrassment. Arnold's parents walk with him and his friends to school, and Arnold promises his mom and dad that they will see him at 3:30 as the doors close shut behind him.

Cast

The voice cast for the film is made up of 20 actors from the original series, and 11 new cast members to replace former actors who retired, grew up, or died.

 Mason Vale Cotton as Arnold Shortman
 Benjamin Flores Jr. as Gerald Johanssen
 Francesca Marie Smith as Helga Pataki
 Dan Castellaneta as Grandpa Phil Shortman
 Tress MacNeille as Grandma Gertie Shortman, Homeless Woman
 Anndi McAfee as Phoebe Heyerdahl, Reporter
 Justin Shenkarow as Harold Berman
 Olivia Hack as Rhonda Wellington Lloyd
 Gavin Lewis as Eugene Horowitz
 Aiden Lewandowski as Sid
 Jet Jurgensmeyer as Stinky Peterson
 Laya Hayes as Nadine
  Nicolas Cantu as Thaddeus "Curly" Gammelthorpe
 Dan Butler as Mr. Robert Simmons
 Maurice LaMarche as Big Bob Pataki, Homeless Man 1, Flunky Guard
 Kath Soucie as Miriam Pataki
 Nika Futterman as Olga Pataki
 Craig Bartlett as Miles Shortman, Brainy, Abner, Monkeyman
 Antoinette Stella as Stella Shortman
 Carlos Alazraqui as Eduardo
 Dom Irrera as Ernie Potts
 Wally Wingert as Oskar Kokoshka, Mr. Hyunh, Homeless Man 2
 Rick Corso as Dino Spumoni
 Danny Cooksey as Stoop Kid
 Danielle Judovits as Big Patty Smith
 Jim Belushi as Coach Jack Wittenberg
 Stephen Stanton as Pigeon Man
 Lane Toran as Crewman, Pirate 1, Guard 1, Che
 Jamil Walker Smith as Paulo, Guard 2, Pirate 2
 Hope Levy as Girl Queen
 Alfred Molina as Lasombra

Production

Development
In 1998, when Nickelodeon renewed Hey Arnold! for a fourth season, they offered series creator Craig Bartlett a chance to develop two feature-length films based on the series: one as a TV movie or direct-to-video, called Arnold Saves the Neighborhood, and another slated for a theatrical release. Nickelodeon asked Bartlett to do "the biggest idea he could think of" for the theatrical film. After looking at the series, Bartlett decided to make the theatrical feature as a spiritual sequel/follow-up to the Season 5 episode "Parents Day", and have Arnold try to solve the question of what happened to Miles and Stella, his parents. This became known as Hey Arnold!: The Jungle Movie. In 2001, executives at Nickelodeon and Paramount Pictures decided to give the made-for-TV movie Arnold Saves the Neighborhood a theatrical release instead in 2002, under the title of Hey Arnold!: The Movie to attract the attention of the public, after successful test screenings. Around this time, Nickelodeon also asked Bartlett to produce a special one-hour "prequel" episode called "The Journal" that would serve as a lead-in to the second film. The episode aired on Nickelodeon on November 11, 2002.

However, Hey Arnold!: The Movie was a critical and commercial failure, resulting in the cancellation of The Jungle Movie and leaving Hey Arnold! with an unresolved cliffhanger ending.

During subsequent years, Bartlett shared many details, characters and plot points of the film; however, he did not reveal any significant spoilers in the event that the film might someday get made. Around 2009, many fans started online petitions to convince Nickelodeon to greenlight The Jungle Movie. In 2011, reruns of Hey Arnold! on TeenNick's late-night classic Nickelodeon programming block The '90s Are All That increased public attention in the series and its cancelled film. In October 2012, Bartlett revealed that he was back at Nickelodeon having meetings with them. In December 2014, it was revealed that Bartlett and Nickelodeon's executives were interested in reviving Hey Arnold!.

In September 2015, Nickelodeon announced officially during an interview with Entertainment Weekly that they were considering reviving many of their old properties, and that Hey Arnold! was one of them. On November 23, 2015, Nickelodeon reported that they were working on a Hey Arnold! TV film that would answer all the fans' questions, including the whereabouts of Arnold's parents, with Bartlett set to write and produce. On March 1, 2016, it was announced that the film would be released in 2017. The next day, Bartlett confirmed officially that the TV film would be The Jungle Movie and that it would be released as a two-hour TV film.

Writing
According to Bartlett, the story of The Jungle Movie was originally written and produced between 1998 and 2001 by Steve Viksten, Jonathan Greenberg and himself. Storyboards were drafted by Raymie Muzquiz and test footage was produced.

In the years following the film's cancellation, Bartlett confirmed many plot points of the film, such as the revelation of Arnold's name during the opening sequence and that Arnold still had the map of the jungle of San Lorenzo that he found in "The Journal". He also revealed that Lasombra was searching for La Corazón, a fabulous jewel and sacred relic of the Green-Eyed people, the tribe that Miles and Stella helped in the past. Helga's and Arnold's relationship would also take a next step, after Helga kissed Arnold in the climax of the Hey Arnold!: The Movie. Bartlett mentioned in an interview that The Jungle Movie was the first thing he pitched when he came back to Nickelodeon.

In June 2016, Bartlett confirmed that the TV film was written to take place with the kids going into the fifth grade, one year after the ending of the original series. In July 2016, Variety showed various artworks of the main characters.

As revealed in a promo during the NickSplat premiere, the script for the film was originally twice as long. One particular gag that was cut was the parade sequence in San Lorenzo, in which Olga appears on a parade float, and Helga appears on another dressed as a monkey. In the final version, there is only a very brief shot of the parade.

Casting
On June 13, 2016, it was reported that Francesca Marie Smith, Anndi McAfee, Justin Shenkarow, Olivia Hack, Nika Futterman, Dan Butler, Dan Castellaneta, Tress MacNeille, Antoinette Stella, Carlos Alazraqui, Dom Irrera, Maurice LaMarche, Kath Soucie, Danielle Judovits, Danny Cooksey, Jim Belushi, and Hey Arnold! creator Craig Bartlett himself were attached to reprise their respective roles as Helga, Phoebe, Harold, Rhonda, Olga, Mr. Simmons, Grandpa, Grandma, Stella, Eduardo, Ernie, Bob Pataki, Miriam, Big Patty, Stoop Kid, Coach Wittenberg and Miles; while Lane Toran and Jamil Walker Smith, the original voices of Arnold and Gerald, were attached to return, but as the voices of San Lorenzo tour guides, while being replaced by Mason Vale Cotton and Benjamin Flores Jr. respectively; and Alfred Molina was cast as Lasombra, the film's main antagonist. The next day, it was reported that Gavin Lewis, Jet Jurgensmeyer, Aiden Lewandowski, and Laya Hayes were respectively cast as Eugene, Stinky, Sid and Nadine.

Music
Jim Lang, who previous composed the music for the original series, returned to compose music for the film.

Release

Marketing
On July 10, 2017, Nickelodeon released an "exclusive first look" at the new character designs narrated by Bartlett. Eleven days later, on July 21, to coincide with the Hey Arnold! panel at San Diego Comic-Con, a short scene from the film was released, in which Arnold is presented with a special film about all the good deeds he has done for his neighborhood. The film's official trailer was released on October 6, 2017. An additional trailer was released on the NickSplat YouTube channel on November 7, 2017.

During the month of November, NickSplat (a programming block on TeenNick that regularly features the series) aired Hey Arnold! episodes every night from 12:00 to 1:00 AM (ET/PT). From November 17 to 24, NickSplat aired a marathon of all the episodes of the series, nightly from 12:00 to 6:00 AM (ET/PT).

Distribution
The film premiered on YTV in Canada on January 5, 2018, and had a limited 3-day theatrical premiere in Australia during February 2018 exclusively to certain Hoyts cinemas locations, before airing on Nickelodeon Australia on March 2, 2018, and probably coming soon for movie premiere on 9Go!.

On March 9, 2018, the film received a one-day limited release at select Showcase Cinemas locations in the United States.

Home media
The television film was released on DVD in Region 1 on February 13, 2018, by Paramount Home Entertainment. It was then released on DVD in Region 2 on August 13, 2018, by Paramount Home Entertainment.

Streaming
The television film was released on Hulu on October 1, 2019. Later, it was released on Netflix on November 1, 2019, along with other Nickelodeon TV shows and films, marking a return of Nickelodeon content on Netflix since 2013.

Reception

Critical response
The A.V. Club graded it with an "A−" complimenting the film for preserving the original series' "warm tone and careful pacing, its willingness to let its young characters absorb dramatic moments and contemplate within silences." IGN.com gave the film a score of 7.5 out of 10, noting "the little, unexpected homages to what made Hey, Arnold! such a joy originally that mark the high points of The Jungle Movie." Den of Geeks Shamus Kelly gave it a score of 3 out of 5, giving a more decidedly mixed opinion of the film, praising the opening moments of the film but criticizing the scenes in San Lorenzo. On Rotten Tomatoes it holds an approval rating of 100% based on 8 reviews, with an average rating of 7.9/10.

Ratings
The original broadcast of the film was watched by 1.63 million total viewers when it premiered on Nickelodeon with simulcasts on TeenNick and Nicktoons, with a combined 0.46 rating in the 18–49 demo. On Nickelodeon, the film leaked into Nick at Nite, causing the ratings to be reported separately for each hour of the film, since Nielsen considers Nick at Nite a separate network despite being on the same channel. The combined average was 1.268 million total viewers, with 1.390 million total viewers for the Nickelodeon hour and 1.146 million total viewers for the Nick at Nite hour, with an average 0.39 rating in the 18–49 demo. On TeenNick and Nicktoons, the film was watched by 128,000 total viewers (0.04 18–49) and 234,000 total viewers (0.03 18–49), respectively.

Awards and nominations

References

External links

 Hey Arnold!: The Jungle Movie on Netflix
 

2017 television films
2017 animated films
2010s American animated films
2010s adventure films
American children's animated adventure films
American children's animated comedy films
Animated films based on animated series
Animated films about friendship
Animated films about children
Films about missing people
Films about vacationing
Films set in South America
Jungle adventure films
Hey Arnold!
Television sequel films
Nickelodeon animated films
Nickelodeon original films
American television series finales
2010s English-language films